Holidays in Hell is a non-fiction book by P.J. O'Rourke about his visits to areas of conflict during the 1980s as a foreign correspondent, as well as to some less high-profile locations.

Places visited

Lebanon, October 1984 
During the Lebanon Civil War

Korea, December 1987 
After the June Struggle, during the chaos that accompanied the democratic elections that followed.

Panama, July 1987 
During the Manuel Noriega regime, and the protests against it.

Poland, May 1986 
Under Soviet control and communism.

United States 

 January 1987: Heritage USA
 September 1986: Harvard 350th anniversary celebration
 May 1983: Epcot
 December 1987: Reagan/Gorbachev Summit

Philippines, March 1987 
After the end of the Marcos regime

El Salvador 
During the Salvadoran Civil War

Australia, February 1987 
At the America's Cup

South Africa, December 1986 
During apartheid, but during the period in which activists in the United States and Europe were calling for divestment from South Africa.

Various nations in western Europe, April-May 1986

Nicaragua, September 1987 
During the Sandinista period, and when the U.S. backed Contras were waging a civil war.

Mexico, October 1986

Israel, January 1988

References

American travel books
American political books
Atlantic Monthly Press books
1988 non-fiction books